Michael Herzog may refer to:
Michael Herzog (ice hockey) (1952–2011), Austrian ice hockey player
Michael Herzog (neuroscientist) (born 1964), German neuroscientist
Michael Herzog (ambassador), Israeli ambassador to the U.S, brother of the president of Israel, Yitzhak Herzog

See also
Mikel Herzog, Basque singer-songwriter